Stephen I (Step'anoz I or Stephanoz I; died 627), of the Guaramid Dynasty, was a presiding prince of Iberia (Kartli, central and eastern Georgia) from c. 590 to 627. He was killed during the battle with the invading Byzantine army.

The son and successor of Guaram I of Iberia, Stephen reversed his father’s pro-Byzantine politics to pro-Iranian and, through loyalty to his Sassanid suzerains, succeeded in reuniting Iberia under his sway. He made Tbilisi his capital and defended it with a Georgian-Iranian force when the Byzantine emperor Heraclius, in alliance with the Khazars, attacked Iberia in 626 (see Byzantine–Sassanid War of 602–628). Stephen was taken captive in the fighting and Heraclius had him flayed alive. His office was given to Adarnase I, his relative of the old Chosroid house.

The period of Stephen's rule coincided with another crucial moment in the history of Georgia. When Stephen switched from a pro-Byzantine position to cooperation with Iran, his religious sympathies shifted toward anti-Chalcedonism, leading to its official adoption by the catholicos of Iberia in 598 or 599. By 608, however, the Georgian Orthodox Church returned to a Chalcedonic position, prompting the sister church of Armenia to break communion with the Georgian church and excommunicate its catholicos Kirion I. It was Heraclius’s campaign, however, that brought about the final victory of Chalcedonian faith in Iberia.

Stephen I was the first among the Georgian rulers who inscribed on the obverse of the "Ibero-Sassanid" drachmas minted by himself the initials of his name, symmetrically placed on the border in Georgian stylized letters. On the reverse of his coins, instead of the sacred flame (Atar), the principal emblem of Zoroastrianism, he placed the Cross – symbol of the victory of Christianity. This was a significant political act pointing not to Stephen’s mere Iranophilia, but rather to his efforts to reestablish the political autonomy of eastern Georgia and strengthen the Christian church.

The exterior stone plaque of the church of the Holy Cross at Mtskheta, Georgia, mentions the principal builders of this church: Stephanos the patricius, Demetrius the hypatos, and Adarnase the hypatos who have traditionally been equated by the Georgian scholars with Stephen I, son of Guaram; Demetre, brother of Stephen I and Adarnase I. However, an opinion expressed by Professor Cyril Toumanoff disagrees with this view by identifying these individuals with Stephen II, Demetre (brother of Stephen I), and Adarnase II (son of Stephen II), respectively.

See also
 Sasanian Iberia

References

External links

Georgian-Sassanian coinage: obverse and reverse of Stephanos I's drachma. Money Museum at the National Bank of Georgia.

627 deaths
Princes of Iberia
Monarchs killed in action
6th-century monarchs in Asia
7th-century monarchs in Asia
People of the Byzantine–Sasanian War of 602–628
People of Byzantine descent
People executed by flaying
Year of birth unknown
Vassal rulers of the Sasanian Empire
Georgians from the Sasanian Empire
Guaramid dynasty